Hemigymnus is a genus of wrasses native to the Indian and Pacific oceans.

Species
There are currently 3 recognized species in this genus:
 Hemigymnus fasciatus Bloch, 1792 (Barred thicklip)
 Hemigymnus melapterus Bloch, 1791 (Blackeye thicklip)
 Hemigymnus sexfasciatus Rüppell, 1835

References

 
Labridae
Marine fish genera
Taxa named by Albert Günther